Insulestremia is a genus of midges in the family Cecidomyiidae. There is only one described species in this genus, Insulestremia sinclairi, which is known only from the Galapagos Islands. It was established by Mathias Jaschhof in 2004.

References

Cecidomyiidae genera
Insects described in 2004
Taxa named by Mathias Jaschhof
Diptera of South America
Monotypic Diptera genera